Augustinus Kim Jong-soo (born February 8, 1956) is a South Korean prelate of the Catholic Church and the current Bishop of the Diocese of Daejeon.

Biography
Kim was born in Daeheung-dong, Daejeon, South Korea and ordained a priest on February 13, 1989. On February 10, 2009, Pope Benedict XVI appointed him Auxiliary Bishop of Daejeon and Titular Bishop of Sufasar. On March 3, 2009, he was consecrated by Joseph Kyeong Kap-ryong, retired Bishop of Daejeon, with Lazarus You Heung-sik, and Cardinal Nicolas Cheong Jin-suk, Archbishop of Seoul, as co-consecrators.

Pope Francis appointed him Bishop of Daejeon on February 26, 2022.

References

South Korean Roman Catholic bishops
1956 births
Living people
Bishops appointed by Pope Benedict XVI
Roman Catholic bishops of Daejeon